Events from the year 1507 in art.

Events

Works

Painting
 Vittore Carpaccio
St. Augustine in His Study (Scuola di San Giorgio degli Schiavoni, Venice)
St. George Baptizing the Selenites
St. Thomas in Glory between St Mark and St Louis of Toulouse
 Albrecht Dürer
Adam and Eve
Avarice
 Giorgione – The Three Philosophers
 Leonardo da Vinci – Salvator Mundi (approximate date)
 Filippino Lippi, finished by Pietro Perugino – Annunziata Polyptych
 Michelangelo – Doni Tondo (approximate date of completion)
 Pietro Perugino – Baptism of Jesus (Oratory of Nunziatella, Foligno)
 Raphael
Ansidei Madonna
La belle jardinière
Canigiani Holy Family
The Deposition
Saint Catherine of Alexandria
 Tang Yin – Clearing after Snow on a Mountain Pass

Births
 Pierre Bontemps, French sculptor known for his funeral monuments during the French Renaissance (died 1562)
 Girolamo Comi, Italian Renaissance painter (died 1581)
 Juan de Juni, French–Spanish sculptor (died 1577)
 Luca Longhi, Italian painter (died 1580)
 Luca Martini, Italian arts patron (died 1561)
 Jacopo Strada, Italian painter, architect, goldsmith, inventor of machines, numismatist, linguist, collector and merchant of works of art (died 1588)
 1507/1508: Wenzel Jamnitzer, Northern Mannerist goldsmith, artist, and printmaker in etching (died 1585)

Deaths
February 23 – Gentile Bellini, Italian painter (born 1429)
date unknown
Rueland Frueauf the Elder, Austrian late-Gothic painter (born 1440)
Fernando Gallego, Spanish painter brought up in an age of gothic style (born 1440)
Albertus Pictor, Swedish mural painter (born c. 1440)
Cosimo Rosselli, Italian painter of the Quattrocento, active mainly in Florence (born 1439)

 
Years of the 16th century in art
1500s in art